Nagy-Küküllő was an administrative county (comitatus) of the Kingdom of Hungary. Its territory is now in central Romania (central Transylvania). Nagy-Küküllő is the Hungarian name for the river Târnava Mare. The capital of the county was Segesvár (present-day Sighișoara).

Geography

Nagy-Küküllő County shared borders with the Hungarian counties Alsó-Fehér, Kis-Küküllő, Udvarhely, Háromszék, Brassó, Fogaras, and Szeben. The river Târnava Mare formed part of its northern border and the river Olt part of its southern border. Its area was  around 1910.

History
Nagy-Küküllő County came into existence in 1876, when the administrative structure of Transylvania was changed and Küküllő County was split. In 1920, by the Treaty of Trianon, the county became part of Romania. Its territory lies in the present Romanian counties Sibiu (the west), Brașov (the south-east), and Mureș (around Sighișoara).

Demographics

Subdivisions

In the early 20th century, the subdivisions of Nagy-Küküllő County were:

Notes

References 

Kingdom of Hungary counties in Transylvania